The Rehab is the fourth independent album by rapper Young Buck. It was released on September 7, 2010. A remix version was released in 2019.

Background
Originally intended to be his third studio album, its release was promised since early 2008, but was repeatedly pushed back due to Young Buck's problems with G-Unit and 50 Cent. At one point, Buck made an exaggerated claim when he said that The Rehab will sell a million copies in his first week to buy himself out of his contract with G-Unit Records. The track "Hood Documentary" is a diss track directed at 50 Cent. The announcement came amidst rumors that 50 Cent had finally released Buck from his G-Unit contract.
On September 13, 2010 an interview with Shade 45 radio host Angela Yee, 50 Cent stated that Young Buck is still signed to G-Unit Records.

Commercial performance
The Rehab debuted at number 55 on the U.S. Billboard 200 chart, selling over 6,400 units in its first week.

Singles
"When the Rain Stops" became the first single when it was released to iTunes on May 18, 2010. "Ya Betta Know It" became the second single when it was released on iTunes on June 8, 2010. "Hood Documentary" is the third and final single. A music video was released for the single "When the Rain Stops".

Track listing

References

External links 
 

2010 albums
Albums produced by Cozmo
Albums produced by Big Hollis
Real Talk Entertainment albums
Young Buck albums